This is a list of German television related events from 1978.

Events
 22 April – West Germany's representative Ireen Sheer finishes in sixth place at the 1978 Eurovision Song Contest in Paris.

Debuts

ARD
 2 January – 
 MS Franziska (1978)
 Mein lieber Mann (1978)
 3 January – Wenn die Liebe hinfällt (1978)
 19 January – Detektiv Harvey (1978–1979)
 11 February – 
 Zwei himmlische Töchter (1978)
 Die Gimmicks (1978)
 13 February – Anton Keil, der Specialkommissär (1978)
 24 February – Uncle Bräsig (1978–1980)
 26 February – Die Geschichte von Felix und Frauke (1978)
 28 March – Der rostrote Ritter (1978)
 4 April – Oh, This Father (1978–1981)
 19 April – Ausgerissen! Was nun? (1978)
 4 June –  (1978)
 31 July – Karschunke & Sohn (1978)
 14 August  –  (1978–1980)
 11 September – Die Kur (1978)
 17 November – Unternehmen Rentnerkommune (1978–1979)
 4 October – Lean Times (1978–1979)
 16 October – Drei Damen vom Grill (1978–1992)
 26 December –  (1978)

ZDF
 2 January – 
 Schulbus 13 (1978)
 SOKO München (1978–2020)
 13 January – Geschichten aus der Zukunft (1978–1980)
 21 January –  (1978)
 2 February – Mirjam und der Lord vom Rummelplatz (1978)
 25 March – Spannende Geschichten (1978)
 26 March –  (1978)
 10 April – Heiter bis wolkig (1978–1979)
 16 November – Kläger und Beklagte (1978–1979)
 19 November –  (1978)
 8 December –  (1978)
 20 December – Die nächste Party kommt bestimmt (1978–1980)

DFF
 17 February – Schauspielereien (1978)
 19 May – Gefährliche Fahndung  (1978)
 8 September  Ein Zimmer mit Ausblick (1978)
 8 November Marx und Engels - Stationen ihres Lebens (1978–1980)
 2 December  Rentner haben niemals Zeit (1978–1979)

Ending this year
  Aus dem Logbuch der Peter Petersen (since 1977)
  Eichholz und Söhne (since 1977)